Northwood School could be:

Northwood School (Lake Placid, New York) 
Northwood School (Durban North, South Africa) 
Northwood School, London 
Northwood Public School, Windsor, Ontario